is a professional wrestling video game released in 2000 for the Nintendo 64 game console. The game was only released in Japan and is the sequel to 1997's Virtual Pro Wrestling 64. The subtitle, Ōdō Keishō, translates to English as Royal Road Succession, which is also the name of the game's single player mode.

The game features the same engine as WWF WrestleMania 2000 but the two titles otherwise differ considerably and feature entirely different rosters. WrestleMania 2000 was released in Japan as well, unlike previous AKI-developed WCW titles.

Production
At the 1999 Nintendo Space World, fans got a preview of the game which was 65% completed. Modes boasted were Tournament, League, Ranking and Grand Meeting, as well as the newly added Belt Edit, Champion Road and an expanded player creation mode. The game was said to have over 1,000 different move combinations and a roster of "way over 100 fighters".

Features
Catering to the Japanese fanbase, Virtual Pro Wrestling 2: Ōdō Keishō deemphasizes the gimmicks and theatrics of American wrestling while introducing various competitive, sportsman-like attributes of puroresu. It features no WWF license and is based entirely on Japanese wrestling; consequently, unlike previous games which included WCW wrestlers, none of the current WWF superstars at the time were included in VPW 2. Asmik Ace Entertainment was only licensed to genuinely represent talent from AJPW; thus, for legal purposes, all other performers were given generic names and altered apparel with the ability to be modified by the player.

VPW 2 omitted the newly introduced Cage match and First Blood match of WrestleMania 2000 as they were unconventional to Japanese wrestling (although, a "First Blood" option does exist, whereby, if the wrestler bleeds twice the match is stopped by the official). It did, however, resurrect the test-of-strength grappling function and the striking combination grapple from 1998's WCW/nWo Revenge.  It also introduced the running grapple as an intuitive counterpart to the long-established running strike. VPW 2 boasts hundreds of moves including many prohibited in mainstream American wrestling such as the dangerous hangman's DDT, Russian neckdrop, and Burning Hammer. In a first for 3D wrestling games, an entirely unique grappling system was also developed for mixed martial artists which corresponds with optional shootfighting rules. Such stipulations place emphasis on strike combinations, judo takedowns, and submissions and allows strikes to cause substantial damage. This in conjunction with professional wrestling standards allows for unique hybrid-style matches.

In contrast to the theatrical entrances of American pro wrestlers, performers in VPW 2 are given a simple backstage intro and are audibly announced upon entering the ring. Venues include the Nippon Budokan, Kawasaki Stadium, Korakuen Hall, and the Tokyo Dome. Entrance themes are limited to a few signature AJPW themes and original MIDI songs of generic rock music. The player can also choose from three different referees with distinct reaction times and count speeds.

VPW 2 expanded the Create a Wrestler mode that debuted in WrestleMania 2000 and boasts a detailed mask editing feature. The game includes a largely generic roster based on real-life performers which sets the foundation for the player to modify attire and names to create more faithful representations of the actual wrestlers. VPW 2 is the only game in the THQ/AKI series to include a "Logic" factor. When creating a wrestler, the player can choose what types of moves are used at certain points of the match when the created wrestler is controlled by the computer. The Belt Creation mode is carried over with a new addition, the Triple Crown, which unifies three championship belts (the PWF World Heavyweight Championship, NWA International Heavyweight Championship, and NWA United National Championship). The "Smoking Skull" WWF Heavyweight Championship was originally available for selection within Belt Creation mode, but it was removed from the final version of the game and is currently only accessible through video game cheat devices.

The 12-month Royal Road Succession mode largely parallels the Road to WrestleMania mode included in WrestleMania 2000. As common in Japan, some contests are held over large loving cup trophies rather than championship belts, and opportunities to unlock wrestlers are abundant.

Roster

All Japan Pro Wrestling

New Japan Pro-Wrestling

Frontier Martial Arts Wrestling

Michinoku Pro Wrestling, Osaka Pro Wrestling, and Toryumon

Fighting Network RINGS

Pancrase

Pride FC

BattlARTS

Wrestling Legends

Reception
Virtual Pro Wrestling 2: Ōdō Keishō gained positive reviews. On release, Famitsu magazine scored the game a 30 out of 40 and while IGN's Aaron Boulding criticized the bland pre-match animation, he praised the addition of various moves. Regarding American gamers, Boulding considered it "a nice addition to the library of the most extreme hardcore wrestling fan".

With a strong fanbase behind the AKI wrestling game series, VPW 2 would become the second most popular import title on the N64 after Sin and Punishment. Professional wrestlers Samoa Joe and A.J. Styles, who were both involved in the development of TNA Wrestling's first video game, had hoped the game would replicate the style of VPW 2. Styles, an avid fan of the AKI wrestling series, has cited VPW 2 as the all-time greatest pro wrestling game.

See also
 WWF No Mercy
List of licensed professional wrestling video games

References

2000 video games
Asmik Ace Entertainment games
Japan-exclusive video games
Nintendo 64 games
Nintendo 64-only games
Virtual Pro Wrestling games
Mixed martial arts video games
Syn Sophia games
Multiplayer and single-player video games
Video games developed in Japan